Palaye Royale is a Canadian-American rock band from Las Vegas, formed in 2008 by brothers Remington Leith, Sebastian Danzig, and Emerson Barrett. The brothers' surname was Kropp; each one's stage moniker makes use of their respective middle names. They formed under the name Kropp Circle in 2008 and changed their name to Palaye Royale in 2011.

History

As Kropp Circle (2008–2011)
Kropp Circle was featured in the online Radio Disney show N.B.T. (Next Big Thing) in 2009. In 2011, they changed their name to Palaye Royale, as a reference to the dance hall Palais Royale in Toronto, where their grandparents first met.

As Palaye Royale (2012–present)

Now describing themselves as a "fashion-art rock band", Palaye Royale released their first single "Morning Light" in March 2012. The six-song EP The Ends Beginning was released in June 2013. In 2014 they were the first unsigned band to win MTV's Musical March Madness tournament, beating out artists such as Linkin Park.

In late 2015 they signed with Sumerian Records, and released their first full-length album Boom Boom Room (Side A) in June 2016. The single "Get Higher" peaked at #26 on the Billboard Modern Rock Charts. They travelled with the Warped Tour in 2016. In 2017 Remington Leith provided the singing voice for the character Johnny Faust (otherwise played by Andy Biersack) in the film American Satan; Leith also voiced the singer in the film's fictional band. During this period, the band added bassist Daniel Curcio and guitarist Andrew Martin as touring musicians.

Palaye Royale began recording their second album in early 2018, though material from early sessions was scrapped. The album Boom Boom Room (Side B) was completed just one week before the band joined that year's Warped Tour. The album was released in September 2018. During this period, the band's British fans organized a series of meet-ups in public parks called Palaye in the Park; the band attended this first one in London, and fans in other countries have adopted the practice.

The band organized their tour in the spring 2019 to support Boom Boom Room (Side B); during the time, Sebastian Danzig was arrested for throwing a cup of coffee at a car that tried to run over him and his fiancée's dog. In the summer of that year, Palaye Royale opened for Rob Zombie and Marilyn Manson on the Twins of Evil Tour. In early 2020 the band instituted a series of "pop-up shops" in England, in which that country's fans could attend a special retail event to purchase band merchandise without paying international shipping costs; artwork by drummer Emerson Barrett is often featured at these events. The events spread to other European countries, with the band appearing at some.

The band embarked on a European tour in early 2020 to support their upcoming third album. A February date in Glasgow, Scotland was cancelled due to a disagreement with the venue, and another show in Birmingham, England was cancelled but replaced by a sold-out show in Wolverhampton. Just before a show in Prague, Czech Republic, the rest of the tour was canceled due to the COVID-19 pandemic. The band's third album, The Bastards, was released in May 2020 and included songwriting contributions from touring musicians Daniel Curcio and Andrew Martin. Curcio was fired from the band in June 2020 due to allegations of online misconduct.

On July 5, 2021, the band announced the beginning of a new album era and the upcoming release of two new singles. On July 9 both singles, titled "No Love In LA" and "Punching Bag", were released on all platforms. On October 11, 2021, the band released a new single titled "Paranoid". The title of the album Fever Dream was officially announced on November 16 during an interview with Ted Stryker, followed by a post on the group's official Twitter account. On the 20 of May they released their song Broken, followed by the album's titular track Fever Dream on July 15.
On August 3 they announced their 2023 Fever Dream European & UK tour, with special guests Yonaka.

Musical style

The band have frequently been described as, and identify themselves as, fashion-art rock, as well as being described as rock and roll, glam rock, indie rock and garage rock. They have cited influences such as The Animals, The Faces, Small Faces, The Rolling Stones, The Doors, David Bowie, T. Rex, The Velvet Underground and classical music. Classic Rock Magazine described their style as "crash[ing] from My Chemical Romance-influenced rock to New York Dolls-ish punk via dashes of Stones-y blues".

Band members

Current
 Remington Leith – lead vocals (2008–present)
 Sebastian Danzig – guitar, keyboards (2008–present)
 Emerson Barrett – drums, piano (2008–present)
 Andrew Martin – guitar (2018–present)
 Jennie Vee – bass (2021–present)

Past
 Daniel Curcio – bass (2017–2020)

Discography

Studio albums
 Boom Boom Room (Side A) (2016) No. 21 US Billboard Heatseekers Albums
 Boom Boom Room (Side B) (2018) No. 89 US Billboard 200
 The Bastards (2020) No. 192 Billboard 200 / No. 27  Billboard Top Rock Albums Chart / No. 12  Billboard Top Alternative Albums Chart
 Fever Dream (2022)

EPs
 The Ends Beginning (2013)
 Get Higher / White (2013)
 No Love in LA / Punching Bag (2021)

Singles
 "Morning Light" (2012)
 "Get Higher" (2013; re-released 2017) No. 26 US Mainstream Rock Songs
 "You'll Be Fine" (2018) No. 22 US Mainstream Rock Songs
 "Death Dance" (2018)
 "Fucking with My Head" (2019)
 "Nervous Breakdown" (2019)
 "Hang On to Yourself" (2019) No. 39 US Mainstream Rock Songs
 "Massacre, the New American Dream" (2019)
 "Lonely" (2020)
 "Little Bastards" (2020)
 "Anxiety" (2020)
 "Mad World" (2020)
 "Nightmares in Paradise" (from "Paradise City") (2021)
 "No Love in LA" (2021)
 "Punching Bag" (2021) No. 34 US Alternative Airplay
 "Paranoid" (2021)
 "Broken" (2022)
 "Fever Dream" (2022)
 "Lifeless Stars" (2022) No. 36 US Alternative Airplay
 "Destrozado y Roto" (Spanish language version of "Broken") (2022)

Awards and nominations

References

External links
 

Art rock musical groups
American indie rock groups
American garage rock groups
Canadian indie rock groups
Canadian garage rock groups
Glam rock groups
Musical groups established in 2008
Musical groups from Toronto
Musical groups from Las Vegas
Sumerian Records artists